Bible Land was a free roadside attraction, originally located in Temecula, California, and later moved to  Yucaipa, California along Interstate 10. Built in Temecula during the late 1960s by sand sculptor Ted Conibear, the attraction featured sand sculptures of various scenes primarily of the New Testament, including a life-sized rendition of the Last Supper. The Last Supper scene was covered by a cavelike structure, likely to both protect the delicate sand sculpture from weather and also to recreate the indoor environment of the original painting.

Conibear, who traveled the American Southwest as an itinerant artist and sand sculptor, maintained the attraction until his death in 1994.  His son, Don Conibear, attempted to keep the landmark intact but found it unfeasible for various reasons. The sculptures had been badly eroded by wind and insects, and Conibear felt that any type of restoration effort would in-authenticate the work of his father. Conibear also looked for someone new to maintain the sculptures and investors to keep the site running but did not find either. It was believed that Ted Conibear had told his son Don to destroy the sculptures so that they would not fall victim to vandalism, but the son reportedly debunked that rumor online in 2011.
The former site, a short distance east of the Live Oak Canyon Road exit along the northern shoulder of Interstate 10, remains empty and undeveloped.

References

External links
 Cast From Sand; Bible Land I (destroyed), pasadenaadjacent.com

1994 disestablishments in California
Calimesa, California
Roadside attractions in California
Tourist attractions in Riverside County, California
1960s establishments in California